Georgia is a feminine given name originating from the Greek word Γεωργία, meaning agriculture. It shares this origin with the masculine version of the name, George.

Given name

Actresses
 Georgia Groome (born 1992), British Actress
 Georgia Apostolou (1973–2016), Greek actress
 Georgia Caine (1876–1964), American actress
 Georgia Cayvan (1857–1906), American actress
 Georgia Ellis (1917–1988), American actress
 Georgia Engel (1948–2019), American actress
 Georgia May Foote (born 1991), British actress
 Georgia Hale (1905–1985), American actress
 Georgia Henshaw (born 1993), Welsh actress
 Georgia King (born 1986), British actress
 Georgia Tennant (born 1984), English actress
 Georgia Slowe (born 1966), English actress
 Georgia Taylor (born 1980), English actress
 Georgia Vasileiadou (1897–1980), Greek actress
 Georgia Steel (born 1998), English actress

Athletes
 Georgia Abatzidou (born 1969), Greek long-distance runner
 Georgia Adams (born 1993), English cricketer
 Georgia Bohl (born 1997), Australian swimmer
 Georgia Bonora (born 1990), Australian gymnast
 Georgia Dorotheou (born 1980), Greek handball player
 Georgia Ellinaki (born 1974), Greek water polo player
 Georgia Glastris (born 1992), Greek figure skater
 Georgia Kokloni (born 1981), Greek sprinter
 Georgia (Tzina) Lamprousi (born 1993), Greek volleyball player
 Georgia Lara (born 1980), Greek water polo player
 Georgia Manoli (born 1983), Greek swimmer
 Georgia Marris (born 1996), New Zealand swimmer
 Georgia Schweitzer (born 1979), American basketball player
 Georgia Tsiliggiri (born 1972), Greek pole vaulter
 Georgia Tzanakaki (born 1980), Greek volleyball player
 Georgia Walker (born 1998), Australian rules footballer
 Georgia Wilson (field hockey) (born 1996), Australian field hockey player
 Georgia Wilson (equestrian) (born 1995), British para-equestrian
 Georgia Wilson (footballer) (born 2002), English footballer

Artists
 Georgia O'Keeffe (1887–1986), American artist
 Georgia Papageorge (born 1941), South African artist

Businesswomen
 Georgia Emery (1867–1931), American businesswoman
 Georgia Frontiere (1927–2008), American businesswoman

Musicians
 Georgia Mannion (born 2003), Australian singer-songwriter known professionally as George Alice
 Georgia Barnes (born 1990), British singer known mononymously as Georgia
 Georgia Brown (English singer) (1933–1992)
 Georgia Brown (Brazilian singer) (born 1980)
 Georgia Buchanan (born 1991), English singer and songwriter
 Georgia Carroll (1919–2011),  American singer
 Georgia Gibbs (1918–2006), American singer
 Georgia Holt (1926–2022), American singer
 Georgia Middleman (born 1967), American country singer
 Georgia Anne Muldrow, American singer and musician
 Georgia Spiropoulos (born 1965), Greek composer
 Georgia Turner (1921–1969), American singer
 Georgia White (1903–c.1980), American blues singer

Models
 Georgia Salpa (born 1985), Greek-Irish model

Politicians
 Georgia Lee Lusk (1893–1971), American politician
 Georgia Davis Powers (1923–2016), American politician

Writers
 Georgia Byng (born 1965), British author
 Georgia Douglas Johnson (1880–1966), American poet
 Georgia Makhlouf, Lebanese writer
 Georgia Toews, Canadian novelist

Other
 Georgia of Clermont (died 500), French saint and nun
 Georgia Harkness (1891–1974), American theologian
 Georgia Lass, character played by Ellen Muth on the television series Dead Like Me
 Georgia B. Ridder (1914–2002), American racehorse owner
 Georgia Tann (1891–1950), American operator of black market baby-adoption scheme
 Georgia Thompson (born 1950), American civil servant
 Georgia Hardstark (born 1980), American television and podcast host
 Georgia Day, US State of Georgia commemoration day

Fictional characters
 Georgia George Fayne, a main character in the Nancy Drew series
 Georgia Riley, six-year-old daughter of protagonist Derek Riley from the 2012 horror movie Daddy's Little Girl 
 Georgia the Guinea Pig Fairy, character from the Rainbow Magic book franchise
 Georgia Adyang Ferrer, the main villain in the Filipino drama series, Ika-6 Na Utos

See also
 Georgia (disambiguation), for other entities with this name
 George (given name), the male name
 Name of Georgia (country), the nation's name
 Georgina (name), a diminutive of the female name
 Georgette, an alternative feminine form of George
 Jorja

English feminine given names
Greek feminine given names
Irish feminine given names
Scottish feminine given names
Welsh feminine given names